Stunt Records is an independent record label formed in 1990 by Daniel Amos, Terry Scott Taylor, and Tom Gulotta.

This is different from the Stunt Records which is a jazz record label in Denmark.

Discography
 The Swirling Eddies – Swirling Mellow
 Daniel Amos – Live Bootleg '82, (1990)
 Daniel Amos – ¡Alarma! (CD reissue w/3 bonus tracks), (1991)
 Daniel Amos – Doppelgänger (CD reissue w/3 bonus tracks), (1992)
 Various Artists – No Sense of History, (1992) with Alternative Records
 Various Artists – Shirley, Goodness & Misery, (1992) with Alternative Records
 Daniel Amos – Motor Cycle Tracks (CD promo), (1993)
 Terry Scott Taylor – Knowledge & Innocence (collector's edition signed & numbered by Terry), (1993)
 Daniel Amos – Preachers From Outer Space, (1995)
 Loam – Stereoscopic, (1996)
 Terry Scott Taylor – Ten–Gallon Hat Six–song E.P., (1997)
 Eve Selis – Out On a Wire, (1998)
 Eve Selis – Into the Sun, (1999)
 Eve Selis – Long Road Home, (2000)
 Terry Scott Taylor – Imaginarium, (2000)
 Daniel Amos – The Alarma! Chronicles Book Set, (2000)
 Daniel Amos – Mr. Buechner's Dream, with Galaxy21 Music, 2001
 Daniel Amos – When Everyone Wore Hats, (2002)
 Terry Scott Taylor]] – LITTLE, big, (2002)
 Dr. Edward Daniel Taylor – The Prickly Heat Radio Players, 2004
 Dr. Edward Daniel Taylor – The Perfectly Frank, True Story of Christmas
 Terry Scott Taylor – Imaginarium: Songs from the Neverhood, (2005)
 Daniel Amos – Daniel Amos 30th Anniversary Deluxe Reissue (2006)
 The Swirling Eddies – The midget, the speck and the molecule (2007)
 Daniel Amos – Darn Floor – Big Bite 20th Anniversary Edition
 The Lost Dogs – Old Angel (2010)
 Terry Scott Taylor – Swine Before Pearl, Standard & Deluxe Editions (2010)
 Terry Scott Taylor – Swine Before Pearl, Volume 2, (2011)
 Daniel Amos – Daniel Amos Collector's Edition (rerelease of 30th Anniversary edition, 2011)
 Daniel Amos – Shotgun Angel Collector's Edition (2 CD Deluxe Reissue, 2011)
 Daniel Amos – Mr. Buechner's Dream (Reissue with bonus track, 2011)
 Daniel Amos – Tour 2011 (Tour compilation, 2011)
 Terry Scott Taylor – Return to the Neverhood (Comic Book & CD, 2012)
 Daniel Amos – Dig Here Said the Angel (CD, 2012)

Videography
 Daniel Amos - Live in Anaheim 1985, DVD (2004)
 Daniel Amos - The Making of Mr. Buechner's Dream DVD, (2005)
 Daniel Amos - Instruction Through Film, DVD (2007)

See also
 List of record labels

References

Record labels established in 1990
American independent record labels